is a Japanese manga series written and illustrated by Sui Futami. An anime television series adaptation by Pine Jam aired from January to March 2016, and a second season aired from October to December of the same year.

Plot
The story is set in a world where magical girls are not necessary any more, yet girls with the aptitude of magical girls still exist in small number. Yuzuka Hanami, the protagonist, meets a magical creature Miton, and was turned into a magical girl, and starts a “magical” life without battles or other magical girl quests.

Characters

The protagonist. A girl who becomes magical girl after meeting Miton. After she transforms, she was fit in the swimsuit, much to her chagrin and embarrassment. She allows Miton to accompany her but repulses his attempt for intimate interactions. She is serious in studying and good at cooking, unlike many magical girls that Miton knew before. She can create and control water when she is a magical girl.

The magical creature that turns Yuzuka into a magical girl after meeting her. His appearance (to Yuzuka and other girls with the aptitude of magical girls) features a white spherical body with two long wings and a bird-like tail; he is supposed to be invisible and inaudible to the normal people, but he is able to show himself to them at will. Yuzuka and Chiya always keep distance from him, despite of his pursuits for intimate relationship with the girls. His taste is close to that of human, and he has a strong desire for delicious foods.

Yuzuka’s friend who deems Yuzuka as “most important friend” and truly cares about her; for example, she is on guard against Miton for the good of Yuzuka. She is usually emotionless and speaks in mono-tone voice. She can see and hear Miton, and has the aptitude of a magical girl; however, the limitation in Miton’s capacity prevents her from really becoming one. She is fascinated by Yuzaka’s status and figure as magical girl.
 

She is Yuzuka’s acquaintance, and later gets acquainted by Chiya. She is a cute girl, much younger than Yuzaka and Chiya, and behaves very politely and considerately so that she even affects the usually emotionless Chiya. She seems to be able to see and feel Miton.
  

Another magical girl who is met by Yuzuka and Chiya, and then befriends them. She is one grade higher in school than Yuzuka and Chiya. After she transforms, she is fit into a Santa Claus dress. She can control the size of her bag.

A magical creature with the form of a flying penguin. He accompanies Mafuyu.

Yuzuka’s father, a typical salary-man who is away from home for most of time due to his job. He cares about his daughter.

 
Yuzuka’s mother. She accidentally witnesses Yuzuka's transformation, and grows special interests in the magical girl status of her daughter.

Manga
The series, written and illustrated by Sui Futami, began publication on Earth Star Entertainment's Comic Earth Star website on 31 March 2015. , series have ended with 43 chapters published. Last one have a web published date on; June 27, 2018.

Volumes

Anime
An anime adaptation was announced in the November issue of the Animage magazine on 10 October 2015. The anime, a TV series, will be directed by Kazuhiro Yoneda, with animation by the animation studio Pine Jam. The series is written by Kazuyuki Fudeyasu and Momoko Murakami, with character designs provided by Kazuaki Shimada, who also serves as the animation director. Yukio Nagasaki is the series' sound director. The show's music is composed by Masato Nakayama and Elements Garden, and produced by F.M.F. The series premiered on 12 January 2016 on Tokyo MX and Sun TV, and was simulcast by Crunchyroll in the Americas, Europe, and Oceania. A second season was announced at an event on 7 August 2016, and premiered on 5 October 2016.

Episode list

Reception
Rebecca Silverman of Anime News Network gave the series a B− rating. In her review, Silverman found the plot too short and meandering, and found the pastel animation a bit of an overreliance, but gave praise to the humor taking shots at the magical girl genre and the light-hearted tone for giving off an approachable vibe, saying that "If you just need a way to spend a cute and fun hour, Mahō Shōjo Nante Mō Ii Desu Kara. is a safe bet".

Notes

References

External links
  at Comic Earth Star 
  
 

2016 anime television series debuts
Pine Jam
Earth Star Entertainment manga
Shōnen manga
Magical girl anime and manga
Comedy anime and manga